Milk! Records is an Australian record label founded in 2012 by musicians Jen Cloher and Courtney Barnett. In early 2019, Tom Larnach-Jones previously of Trifekta Records  took over the role of label manager.

Artists
Current
 Chastity Belt (Australian distribution only)
 Courtney Barnett
 Evelyn Ida Morris
 Hachiku
 Hand Habits
 Jade Imagine
 Jen Cloher
 Loose Tooth
 The Finks
 Tiny Ruins
 East Brunswick All Girls Choir
 Dyson Stringer Cloher
 Sleater-Kinney (Australian distribution only)

Former
 Ouch My Face
 Fraser A. Gorman

Awards and nominations

AIR Awards
The Australian Independent Record Awards (commonly known informally as AIR Awards) is an annual awards night to recognise, promote and celebrate the success of Australia's Independent Music sector.

|-
| AIR Awards of 2015
| Milk! Records
| Best Independent Label
| 
|-
| AIR Awards of 2018
| Milk! Records
| Best Independent Label
| 
|-
| AIR Awards of 2022
| Milk! Records
| Independent Label of the Year
|

National Live Music Awards
The National Live Music Awards (NLMAs) are a broad recognition of Australia's diverse live industry, celebrating the success of the Australian live scene. The awards commenced in 2016.

|-
| National Live Music Awards of 2018
| Milk! Records
| Industry Achievement
| 
|-

References

External links
 Official website
 Official Facebook

Record labels established in 2012
Australian independent record labels
Record labels based in Melbourne